Sittingbourne railway station is on the Chatham Main Line and the Sheerness Line in north Kent. Train services are provided by Southeastern. Ticket barriers are sometimes in operation, depending on the time of day.

Facilities
Two new lifts linked by a new footbridge have created a step-free route between the station entrance and platforms to provide better access to train services. The improvements have been funded through the government’s Access for All programme and cost around £1,800,000.

The work has also included a series of enhancements to station facilities funded through the National Stations Improvement Programme and include relocating and increasing the number of cycle parking spaces outside the station; renovating all passenger toilets; creating new waiting shelters on the platforms and a new waiting room on platform; repositioning the ticket gates to create more space for passengers in the ticket office; and installing a new customer information screen and non-slip flooring in the ticket office.

The Sittingbourne & Kemsley Light Railway's station, at Sittingbourne Viaduct, is a short walk away.

Accidents and incidents
In January 1861, a passenger train was derailed. One passenger was killed.
On 31 August 1878, a passenger train collided with some goods wagons. Five people were killed.
On 27 July 1966, a freight train was derailed at Sittingbourne West Junction. The line was blocked for two days.

Services 
All services at Sittingbourne are operated by Southeastern  using  and  EMUs.

The typical off-peak service in trains per hour is:

 1 tph to London St Pancras International
 2 tph to  
 1 tph to  via 
 2 tph to 
 1 tph to 

References

External links

Railway stations in Swale
DfT Category C2 stations
Former London, Chatham and Dover Railway stations
Railway stations in Great Britain opened in 1858
Railway stations served by Southeastern
Sittingbourne